Sebastian Kindelán y O’Regan, also called Sebastián de Kindelán y Oregón,<ref name=Banreservas>{{cite book|title=Volumen V: Historia|url=http://www.banreservas.com.do/Biblioteca%20Virtual/Pensamiento%20Dominicano/Volumen%20V%20-%20Historia.pdf|work=Colección Pensamiento Dominicano|publisher=Banco de Reservas de la República Dominicana|accessdate=3 November 2013|author=Sociedad Dominicana de Bibliófilos|editor=Frank Moya Pons|location=Santo Domingo|page=247|language=Spanish|isbn=978-9945-457-16-2|year=2009|quote=1818. GOBIERNO DE KINDELÁN. Sucedió a Urrutia don Sebastián de Kindelán y Oregón, quien no sólo era más inteligente que su antecesor, sino que era hombre de vasta ilustración y de tendencias justicieras.}}</ref> (30 December 1757 – 4 May 1826) was a colonel in the Spanish Army who served as governor of East Florida (11 June 1812 – 3 June 1815) and of Santo Domingo during the Second Spanish period (1818–1821), as well as provisional governor of Cuba (1822–1823).

 Biography 

 Early years 
Sebastián Kindelán was born on 30 December 1757 in Ceuta, Spain. He was the son of Vicente Kindelán Luttrell of Luttrellstown and María Francisca O’Regan. His father was an Irishman who settled in Spain and joined the infantry of the Royal Spanish Army, attaining the positions of Brigadier and military governor of Zamora. His mother came from Barcelona but she probably was of Irish descent.
He had a brother, Juan de Kindelán y O'Regan, and a sister, María de la Concepcion Kindelán y O’Regan. Kindelán joined the Spanish Army as a cadet on 18 November 1768. During this time he was a soldier of the infantry regiment of Santiago de Cuba.

 Political career 
Kindelán assumed the governorship of Santiago de Cuba and all the eastern territory of Cuba on 28 March 1799 during a politically sensitive  period of the island's history. In a missive dated 19 February 1804, some of its influential citizens reported to the Spanish Crown the dangerous situation of the island, asserting that Governor Kindelán had encouraged white  refugees from the uprisings in Saint-Domingue to settle in Cuba after the French withdrew from the western portion of Hispaniola. They complained that some twenty thousand or more French immigrants had already acquired land in Cuba,  and were importing black slaves to work their plantations.  The letter accused the governor of irreligion and dishonesty, and condemned him for having licentious habits and setting a bad example for the people. Kindelán rebutted the denunciations vigorously, and defended the French settlers, saying they were peaceful, and had no intention of inciting a revolution such as had occurred in Santo Domingo (Saint-Domingue).

In a letter to the authorities in Spain dated 17 May 1804, Kindelán made note of recent attacks on the British colonies by privateers based in Cuba. He later requested a reassignment, and was transferred to East Florida on 22 September 1811. He was promoted to Brigadier of  Infantry in December of that year. On 11 June 1812, Kindelán  was officially named Royal Governor of Spanish East Florida, being named by the Cádiz Regency. In 1812 rebel groups of Georgians tried to seize Florida, wanting it to be part of the United States. The Seminoles and their black tribal members, some of them enslaved, came to the aid of Spain.

Governor Kindelán sent certain leaders of his black militiamen to meet with the Seminole chiefs King Payne and his successor Bowlegs, who allowed some of their warriors to fight alongside the Spanish as a gesture of goodwill. Kindelán expressed his satisfaction when Bowlegs took two hundred of his men to join the Spanish at the St. Johns River, but complained that every time the Seminoles captured a slave, a horse or anything else of value, they left the field to try to secure the catch in their villages, so their utility as fighters was only temporary. Like his predecessors, Gov. Kindelán used black translators, including the free mulatto  militiaman, Benjamin Wiggins, and the slave Tony Doctor (Antonio Proctor), whom he described as "known to be the best interpreter of Indian languages in the province", to promote a Spanish, Black, and Indian alliance. In July 1812, Proctor traveled to the Seminole town of Alachua to meet with the chief King Payne, who called upon several hundred of his warriors to assist the Spanish.

Kindelán left the position of Governor of East Florida on 3 June 1815, when he  was appointed Attaché to the General Staff of Cuba, but on  12 August that same year he was given the rank of Lieutenant in Havana. Three years later, in 1818, he was elected acting governor of the Second Spanish Colony of Santo Domingo. As governor, he was faced with the problem of the Haitians who wanted to take over that part of the island of Hispaniola. On 12 September 1819, Kindelán was awarded the Grand Cross of San Fernando, third class, for his efforts in Florida in 1813 to stop the American attacks in the colony; he was also a Knight of the Order of Santiago.

Kindelán was replaced by Brigadier Pascual Real as colonial governor of Santo Domingo in 1821, prior to the short-lived independence of that colony won by José Núñez de Cáceres and his group. In 1822, as Cabo Subalterno, he was appointed Provisional Captain-General (or Governor) of Cuba to replace former Gov. Nicolás Mahy y Romo. Like his predecessor, Kindelán strove to unite the military and civil power in the office of the Captain-General; this effort aroused antagonism between the Spanish troops and the local militia. Between 1824 and 1826 he served as Field marshal (Mariscal de Campo)'' of the royal army, and died in Santiago de Cuba on 4 May 1826, with that rank.

Personal life 
Kindelán married Ana Manuela Mozo de la Torre Garvey in the Cathedral of Santiago de Cuba on 11 December 1801. The couple had six children: Juan (born in Santiago de Cuba on 8 September 1806),  Bárbara, Vicente (1808–1877), Fernando (1808–1889), María (1810–1879) and Mariana (1810–1880).

See also 
Flight of the Wild Geese

References

External links 
 Encyclopedia of the War of 1812.
 Panorama histórico de la literatura cubana. Arte y sociedad: Editorial Arte y literatura. Arte y Literatura, 1978. Max Henríquez Ureña (death of Kindelán, page 107)

Royal Governors of La Florida
Governors of Cuba
Colonial governors of Santo Domingo
Spanish colonels
People from Ceuta
Spanish people of Irish descent
1826 deaths
1757 births